Acacia lentiginea is a shrub belonging to the genus Acacia and the subgenus Juliflorae that is endemic to north western Australia.

Description
It has obscurely ribbed, terete branchlets. The thin, evergreen phyllodes have a narrowly elliptic shape that can be shallowly recurved. It blooms in May or October and produces yellow flowers.

Taxonomy
The species was first formally described by the botanists Joseph Maiden and William Blakely in 1927 as part of the work Descriptions of fifty new species and six varieties of western and northern Australian Acacias, and notes on four other species as published in the Journal of the Royal Society of Western Australia. It was reclassified as Racosperma lentigineum by Leslie Pedley in 2003 and was transferred back to genus Acacia in 2006.
The type specimen was collected by Charles Austin Gardner in 1921.

Distribution
It is native to a small area in the Kimberley region of Western Australia. It is found around Prince Regent River in the north west of the Kimberley area growing in and around sandstone.

See also
List of Acacia species

References

lentiginea
Acacias of Western Australia
Plants described in 1927
Taxa named by Joseph Maiden
Taxa named by William Blakely